Alejandro Falla won in the final 6–4, 4–6, 6–2, against Horacio Zeballos and he became the first champion of this tournament.

Seeds

Draw

Final four

Top half

Bottom half

References
 Main Draw
 Qualifying Draw

Seguros Bolivar Open Pereira - Singles
2009 Singles